Aphanocalyx hedinii is a species of plant in the family Fabaceae. It is found only in Cameroon. It is threatened by habitat loss.

References

Detarioideae
Flora of Cameroon
Critically endangered plants
Taxonomy articles created by Polbot
Taxobox binomials not recognized by IUCN 
Taxa named by Auguste Chevalier